Hoseyn Khanlu (also Romanized as Ḩoseyn Khānlū) is a village in Pain Barzand Rural District, Anguti District, Germi County, Ardabil Province, Iran. In 2006, its population was 40, in 6 families.

References 

Towns and villages in Germi County